Nerita fulgurans is a species of sea snail, a marine gastropod mollusk in the family Neritidae.

Distribution
Usually found on hard structures in estuarine conditions protected from significant wave action  
Atlantic coast of Florida, as far North as the St. Augustine inlet.

Description

The maximum recorded shell length is 37 mm.

Circulatory system: The osmotic pressure of the hemolymph of Nerita fulgurans is 1060 mOsm.

Habitat 
Minimum recorded depth is 0 m. Maximum recorded depth is 0 m.

References

External links

Neritidae
Gastropods described in 1791
Taxa named by Johann Friedrich Gmelin